Walter Johan Heinrich Steffens (26 December 1908 – 23 August 2006) was a German gymnast who won an Olympic gold medal.

He was born in Barnstorf, the son of a family of craftsmen. In the 1930s, he was one of the best in the world on the pommel horse. In the 1936 Summer Olympics in Berlin he won a gold medal as part of the German team, along with Alfred Schwarzmann and others. He was a sports instructor at the Hamm Gymnasium and at the Freiherr-vom-Stein-Realschule in Bergkamen.

External links
 Page at SportsReference.com
 Article on GYMmedia.de

1908 births
2006 deaths
German male artistic gymnasts
Olympic gymnasts of Germany
Gymnasts at the 1936 Summer Olympics
Olympic medalists in gymnastics
Medalists at the 1936 Summer Olympics
Olympic gold medalists for Germany
20th-century German people
21st-century German people